Begor is a surname. Notable people with the surname include:

Fay B. Begor (1916–1943), American physician and U.S. Navy veteran
Mark Begor (born  1959), American business executive